The Bucknell Bison men's soccer team is an intercollegiate varsity sports team of Bucknell University in Lewisburg, Pennsylvania. They are an NCAA Division I team and member of the Patriot League.

Through its history, Bucknell has played in the Middle Atlantic Conference (1947–73), East Coast Conference (1974–89) and Patriot League (1990-pres.). Bucknell has won all four of its Patriot League titles since 2006 and in doing so has been one of the most successful Patriot League teams in that time.

The Bison are currently coached by Brendan Nash who has the best winning percentage and second most wins of any coach in program history.

NCAA Tournament 
Bucknell has made seven appearances in the NCAA Division I Men's Soccer Championships. The Bison have advanced to the second round three times by defeating Penn State in 1974, George Mason in 2006 and Princeton in 2009.

Stadium 
Emmitt Field at Holmes Stadium hosts games for Bucknell's men's and women's soccer teams. Located on campus, the natural grass pitch was completed in 2005 with the remainder of the lighted stadium and grandstand finished in 2007.

The stadium has an official seating capacity of 1,250 with additional seating on the grass hill behind the north endline. The pitch surface is sand-based Kentucky Blue grass and is 120 by 75 yards.

The field was dedicated as Bison Varsity Soccer Field on September 16, 2005, prior to Bucknell's 3-2 women's soccer victory over Marist. It has since played host to the Patriot League Men's Soccer Tournament in 2009 and the Patriot League women's soccer tournament in 2006, 2007 and 2016.

Holmes Stadium is named to honor the donation from Stephen P. Holmes '79, Chairman and CEO of Wyndham Worldwide and also includes Graham Field (field hockey and women's lacrosse). Emmitt Field was rededicated as such in 2008 in honor of lead donor Richard Emmitt '67, General Partner at The Vertical Group.

Roster 
Updated: August 25, 2022

Head Coaches 
Since 1929, Bucknell has had 15 head coaches.

 No games were played in 1945

All-American Awards 
Source:

NSCAA All-American 
 1960 Lyman Ott
 1960 Bob Schad
 1976 Scott Strasburg
 2009 Conor O'Brien
 2013 Mayowa Alli

NSCAA Scholar All-America Team 
 2004 Adam Edwards
 2011, 2012 Brendan Burgdorf
 2014 Jesse Klug
 2014 Chris Thorsheim

Academic All-American 
 1994, 1995 Greg Beatty
 2001 Ryan Weber
 2003, 2004 Jonathan Hemmert
 2008 Chris Hennings
 2009 Patrick Selwood
 2012, 2013 Joe Meyer
 2014, 2015 Jesse Klug

Patriot League Awards 
Sources:

PL Offensive Player of the Year 
 2003 Scott Visnic
 2008, 2009 Conor O'Brien
 2010 Brendan Burgdorf

PL Defensive Player of the Year 
 2000 Bill Epley
 2003, 2004 Michael Lookingland
 2005 Tim Faneck

PL Goalkeeper of the Year 
 2005 Adam Edwards
 2007 Joey Kuterbach

PL Rookie of the Year 
 2002 Adam Edwards
 2006 Nathan LaGrave
 2010 Mayowa Alli

PL Tournament MVP 
 2006 Joey Kuterbach
 2009 Patrick Selwood
 2010 Ross Liberati
 2014 Sebastiaan Blickman

PL Scholar-Athlete of the Year 
 1993, 1994 Greg Beatty
 2003, 2004 Jonathan Hemmert
 2015 Jesse Klug
 2016 Zack Rockmore
 2019, 2020 Matt Thorsheim

PL Coach of the Year 
 1993 Craig Reynolds
 2000, 2003, 2009 Brendan Nash

References

External links 
 

 
Soccer in Pennsylvania